The Butler is a lost 1916 American comedy directed by Edwin McKim to his own scenario. The film stars Davy Don as Otto the Butler, Florence Williams as Mrs. Van Webber, Patsy De Forest as Gwendoline, George Egan as The Waiter, and Charles Leonard as another Butler.

References

1916 films
American silent short films
Lost American films
American black-and-white films
Silent American comedy films
1916 comedy films
1916 lost films
Lost comedy films
1910s American films